CM501G is a Chinese land attack missile first revealed during the 9th Zhuhai Airshow held in November 2012.  Developed by China Aerospace Science and Industry Corporation (CASIC), CM-501G is also available in air and ship launched versions upon customers' requests, but only the land-based version made its public debut at the airshow.

International comparisons
The CM-501G missile has been said by many Chinese internet sources as the Chinese equivalent of the American NLOS-LS Netfires missile or the Israeli JUMPER missile, but the Chinese missile is much larger than the two western counterparts: in comparison to the 50 to 60 kg range of western missiles, CM-501G weighs around 150 kg, almost three times the weight of Netfires or JUMPER missiles. The >70 km range of the CM-501G is equal to that of the Netfires missile, and is longer than the 50 km range of the JUMPER missile and the warhead of CM-501G is around 40 kg.

Guidance options
CM-501G also has more guidance options such as Satellite/INS, imaging infrared (IIR), semi-active laser homing (SAL) and in-flight updates for re-targeting if needed.  The developer has claimed that the open architecture and modular design concept made the CM-501G system versatile enough to meet different financial constraints customers face by selecting different guidance systems: when budgetary constraints limit the funding, the two way data link and IIR can be replaced by cheaper SAL, and satellite guidance can be any of GPS, GLONASS, or BeiDou.

Launch and command vehicles
The basic CM-501G system consists of two vehicles both based on a Shaanxi Automobile Group SX2190 6 x 6 cross-country heavy-duty truck.  For the launching vehicle, two launchers/containers each consisting of 9 missiles in 3 x 3 arrangement are mounted in the rear, totaling 18. This is more than the 15 of Netfires but less than the 24 of JUMPER.  The command vehicle can use other chassis, such as Dongfeng EQ2050.  When a human operator is in the loop for re-targeting after receiving the update via a two-way data link, this task is completed in the command vehicle. One of the improvement programs of CM-501G is to have the command vehicle integrated with the launching vehicle, so all tasks could be in a single vehicle.  Another improvement program currently underway is the addition of re-targeting capability by forward observers.

Variant
CM-501G None-line-of-sight anti-tank missile. Land-based with 70km range. Four folding control stabilizing fins.
CM-501GA None-line-of-sight anti-tank missile. Lighter version mounted on light vehicles, small ships, and helicopters with 40km range. Four folding rectangle control fins.
CM-501XA (CM-501X) Loitering Munition. The suicide drone will stand by in the air after launch, and can engage multiple enemy target autonomously, Control range is 70km while operational time is 30 minutes.
CM-502V (CM-502) None-line-of-sight multipurpose missile. Light version of CM-501GA with 25km range. Four folding rectangle control fins.
CM-502KG Light multipurpose air-to-surface missile. Debuted at the 9th Zhuhai Airshow in November 2012. Improved version of AR-1 UCAV missile. CM-502KG has an 11-kg warhead similar in size to that of the AR-1, but its maximum range is more than twice that of AR-1, up to 25 km. Four chopped control fins.

See also
ALAS
FOG-MPM
MGM-157 EFOGM
XM501 Non-Line-of-Sight Launch System
Polyphem, a similar European project
Type 96 Multi-Purpose Missile System

References

Guided missiles of the People's Republic of China
Anti-ship cruise missiles of the People's Republic of China
Weapons of the People's Republic of China
Military equipment introduced in the 2010s